Michael Kretschmer (born 7 May 1975) is a German politician of the Christian Democratic Union (CDU) who has been serving as Minister President of Saxony since 13 December 2017. Since 2022, he has been one of four deputy chairs of the CDU, under the leadership of chairman Friedrich Merz.

Political career

Member of Parliament, 2002–2017
From 2002 to 2017 Kretschmer was a member of the Bundestag as directly elected representative for Görlitz. He first served on the Committee on Education, Research and Technology Assessment. In the negotiations to form a coalition government under Chancellor Angela Merkel following the 2009 federal elections, he was a member of the working group on economic affairs and energy, led by Annette Schavan and Andreas Pinkwart.

From 2009 to 2017 Kretschmer was one of the vice chairs of the CDU/CSU parliamentary group, under the leadership of chairman Volker Kauder. During his time in parliament, he was also of the German-Russian Parliamentary Friendship Group and the German-Polish Parliamentary Friendship Group.

In the negotiations to form a Grand Coalition of Chancellor Angela Merkel's Christian Democrats (CDU together with the Bavarian CSU) and the SPD following the 2013 federal elections, Kretschmer led the CDU/CSU delegation in the working group on cultural and media affairs; his counterpart of the SPD was Klaus Wowereit. Over the following years, he co-chaired the CDU’s national conventions in Karlsruhe (2015), Essen (2016) and Berlin (2018).

Kretschmer lost reelection in 2017 to Tino Chrupalla of the AfD.

Minister-President of Saxony, 2017–present

On 18 October 2017, Stanislaw Tillich announced his resignation as Minister President of Saxony and suggested that Kretschmer should replace him. He is only the fourth and also the youngest person to hold that office.

As one of Saxony's representatives at the Bundesrat, Kretschmer has been serving as member of the Committee on Foreign Affairs since 2017. In addition, he is a member of the German-Russian Friendship Group set up in cooperation with Russia's Federation Council.

In the negotiations to form a fourth cabinet under Merkel following the 2017 federal elections, Kretschmer co-chaired the working group on transport and infrastructure, alongside Alexander Dobrindt and Sören Bartol.

In December 2021 ZDF journalists discovered a plot by anti-vaccine and anti-lockdown extremists to assassinate Kretschmer, which led to an investigation by Saxon police and searchings for weapons through several houses in Dresden.

Other activities
 Association of German Foundations, member of the Parliamentary Advisory Board
 Development and Peace Foundation (SEF), deputy chairman of the board of trustees
 Deutsches Museum, Member of the Board of Trustees
 Dresden Frauenkirche, ex officio member of the board of trustees
 Helmholtz Association of German Research Centres, member of the senate
 Max Planck Society, Member of the Senate
 Max Planck Institute for Chemical Physics of Solids, Member of the Board of Trustees
 Max Planck Institute for the Physics of Complex Systems, Member of the Board of Trustees
 Evangelisches Studienwerk Villigst, member of the board of trustees (2009–2013)
 Federal Agency for Civic Education, member of the board of trustees (2002–2005)

Political positions
In June 2017, Kretschmer voted against Germany's introduction of same-sex marriage.

While visiting the St. Petersburg International Economic Forum in 2019, Kretschmer met with President Vladimir Putin and later called for the lifting of EU economic sanctions against Russia. This was immediately rejected by CDU chairwoman Annegret Kramp-Karrenbauer.

He was opposed to restrictions during the beginning of the coronavirus pandemic and even attended an anti-lockdown demonstration, but changed his mind and apologised in December 2020. In November 2021 he disagreed with Federal Minister of Health Jens Spahn on ending the nationwide state of emergency.

Controversy
During his tenure as secretary general of the CDU in Saxony, Kretscher faced criticism after reports surfaced in 2010 that personal meetings with party chairman and Minister-President Stanislaw Tillich  were offered to potential corporate sponsors in exchange for donations.

See also 
 Gretchen Whitmer kidnapping plot

References

External links 

 Personal website

1975 births
Living people
People from Görlitz
Ministers-President of Saxony
Members of the Bundestag 2013–2017
Members of the Bundestag for Saxony
Members of the Bundestag 2009–2013
Members of the Bundestag 2005–2009
Members of the Bundestag 2002–2005
Members of the Bundestag for the Christian Democratic Union of Germany
Recipients of the Order of Merit of the Free State of Saxony